Deirdre K. Breakenridge (born 1966) is an American author and businessperson.  She is known for her writing on public relations and social media.

Education and career
Breakenridge grew up in New Jersey, and she attended Glassboro State College. After working in the public relations industry, she returned to the Fairleigh Dickinson University to get her MBA. Afterward, she continued working in public relations agencies before opening her own agency, Pure Performance Communications. She has also taught classes at several universities as an adjunct professor.

Work 
Breakenridge's first book, Cyberbranding: Brand Building in the Digital Economy (2001), is about how companies can market their brand online. Her 2008 book, PR 2.0 New Media, New Tools, New Audiences, offers public relations groups a way to get involved online in new technologies.

In 2009, Breakenridge published Putting the Public Back in Public Relations with Brian Solis. The Journalism and Mass Communication Educator wrote that the book is useful and well-organized for both beginners and advanced individuals in public relations. The book also describes new trends in social media and how all PR individuals can use these techniques. Putting the Public Back in Public Relations also advises those in PR positions to take on leadership roles to promote the use of the new techniques described in the book.

Breakenridge has also worked on research, such as "Social Media Comes of Age: The Vocus 2011 Planning Survey," which she produced with Vocus in 2010.

Books

References

External links
 

Rowan University alumni
Living people
21st-century American women writers
1966 births
People from Englewood, New Jersey
American public relations people
21st-century American businesswomen
21st-century American businesspeople
Fairleigh Dickinson University alumni
Writers from New Jersey
Businesspeople from New Jersey
American women company founders
American company founders
American women chief executives